Canterano is a  (municipality) in the Metropolitan City of Rome in the Italian region of Latium, located about  east of Rome.

Canterano borders the following municipalities: Agosta, Gerano, Rocca Canterano, Rocca Santo Stefano, Subiaco.

References

External links

Cities and towns in Lazio